Mayhem is a Norwegian black metal band formed in Langhus in 1984. They were one of the founders of the Norwegian black metal scene and their music has strongly influenced the black metal genre. Mayhem's early career was highly controversial, primarily due to their notorious live performances, the 1991 suicide of vocalist Per Yngve Ohlin ("Dead") and the 1993 murder of guitarist Øystein Aarseth ("Euronymous") by former member Varg Vikernes ("Count Grishnackh") of Burzum.

The group released a demo and an EP that were highly influential, and amassed a loyal following through sporadic and notorious live performances, attracting further attention through their ties to the string of Norwegian church burnings and the incidents of violence surrounding them. Mayhem disbanded after Aarseth's murder, shortly before the release of their debut album, De Mysteriis Dom Sathanas, regarded as a classic of the black metal genre. Surviving former members Jan Axel Blomberg ("Hellhammer"), Jørn Stubberud ("Necrobutcher") and Sven Erik Kristiansen ("Maniac") reformed the next year with Rune Eriksen ("Blasphemer") replacing Aarseth. Attila Csihar and Morten Iversen ("Teloch") have since replaced Kristiansen and Eriksen, respectively. Their post-Aarseth material is characterized by increased experimentation. The 2007 album Ordo Ad Chao received the Spellemann Award for best heavy metal album.

History

Early years (1984–1988)

Mayhem was founded in 1984 by guitarist Øystein Aarseth (known initially as "Destructor", later "Euronymous"), bassist Jørn Stubberud ("Necrobutcher") and drummer Kjetil Manheim, taking their band name from the Venom song "Mayhem with Mercy". The band members were mainly influenced by groups such as Venom, Death, Kreator, Motörhead, Necrodeath, Black Sabbath, Slayer, Bathory, Sarcófago, Sodom, Destruction, Celtic Frost, Hellhammer and Parabellum. The lineup began playing cover songs by Black Sabbath, Venom, Motörhead and later recorded the demo Pure Fucking Armageddon. After its release, Aarseth, who used to sing lead vocals, along with Stubberud, during first demo's studio rehearsals, recruited two session vocalists, Eirik Norheim ("Messiah") and Sven Erik Kristiansen ("Maniac"), in 1986 and 1987. Norheim performed vocals only for a concert, which took place on 20 April 1985 in Ski, and by the end of that year he had quit Mayhem. He later formed hardcore punk band Within Range and Oi!/street punk band Cockroach Clan. Whereas, with Kristiansen, Mayhem recorded its first EP, Deathcrush, in 1987, and released it through Euronymous' newly formed label Posercorpse Music. Manheim and Euronymous only played at one show on 22 March 1986 at the Ski theater as L.E.G.O. and the show was recorded on video. This was a side project about experimental music against mainstream.

The initial 1,000 copy release of Deathcrush quickly sold out. It was later reissued in 1993 by the newly renamed Deathlike Silence Productions as a joint venture with Euronymous' Oslo specialist record shop Helvete (Norwegian for "Hell"). Manheim and Maniac left the band in 1988.

With Dead (1988–1991)
After two brief replacements, Maniac and Manheim's positions were filled by Swedish vocalist Pelle Yngve Ohlin ("Dead") and local drummer Jan Axel Blomberg ("Hellhammer"). With Dead, the band's concerts became notorious. For concerts, Dead went to great lengths to achieve the image and atmosphere he wished. From the beginning of his career, he was known to wear "corpse paint", which involved covering his face with black and white makeup. According to Necrobutcher, "[i]t wasn't anything to do with the way Kiss and Alice Cooper used makeup. Dead actually wanted to look like a corpse. He didn't do it to look cool". Hellhammer claimed that Dead "was the first black metal musician to use corpse paint". To complete his corpse-like image, Dead would bury his stage clothes and dig them up again to wear on the night of a concert.

While performing, Dead would often cut himself with hunting knives and broken glass. Additionally, the band often had pig or sheep heads impaled on stakes and planted at the front of their stage.

Stian Johansen ("Occultus"), who briefly took over as vocalist after Dead's suicide, made this statement about him:

"He [Dead] didn't see himself as human; he saw himself as a creature from another world. He said he had many visions that his blood has frozen in his veins, that he was dead. That is the reason he took that name. He knew he would die."

In 1990, the members of Mayhem moved to "an old house in the forest" near Oslo, which was used as a place for the band to rehearse. They began writing songs for their next album, De Mysteriis Dom Sathanas. Mayhem bassist Necrobutcher said that, after living together for a while, Dead and Euronymous "got on each other's nerves a lot" and "weren't really friends at the end". Hellhammer recalls that Dead once went outside to sleep in the woods because Euronymous was playing synth music that Dead hated. Euronymous then went outside and began shooting into the air with a shotgun. Varg Vikernes claims that Dead once stabbed Euronymous with a knife.

On 8 April 1991, Dead committed suicide in the house rented by the band. He was found by Euronymous with slit wrists and a shotgun wound to the head. Dead's suicide note started with the sentence "Excuse all the blood" and included a brief explanation "nobody will ever understand this, but as a sort of explanation, I am not human, this is only a dream and soon I will awake". The full text has become public and it ended by saying "I didn't come up with this now but 17 years ago". Attached to the note, Dead left the lyrics of the song Life Eternal. When Euronymous found all this, he went to a nearby store and bought a disposable camera to photograph the corpse, after re-arranging some items.

Necrobutcher recalls how Euronymous told him of the suicide:Øystein called me up the next day ... and says, "Dead has done something really cool! He killed himself". I thought, have you lost it? What do you mean cool? He says, "Relax, I have photos of everything". I was in shock and grief. He was just thinking how to exploit it. So I told him, "OK. Don't even fucking call me before you destroy those pictures".

Euronymous used Dead's suicide to foster Mayhem's 'evil' image and claimed Dead had killed himself because black metal had become 'trendy' and commercialized. In time, rumors spread that Euronymous had made a stew with bits of Dead's brain and had made necklaces with bits of his skull. The band later denied the former rumor, but confirmed that the latter was true. Moreover, Euronymous claimed to have given these necklaces to musicians he deemed worthy, which was confirmed by several other members of the scene, like Bård 'Faust' Eithun and Jon 'Metalion' Kristiansen. In 2018, a fragment of Dead's skull also went on sale for $3,500, along with the letter from Euronymous that it was posted with. The letter finishes with: "OK! That should be all. I'm enclosing a little piece from Dead's cranium in case you'd like to have it. Hear from you soon!" On a 2019 interview with Loudwire and Consequence of Sound, Necrobutcher claimed to have had plans to kill Euronymous since he was disgusted by his treatment of Dead, but that Vikernes "beat [him] to it".
It remains a trend for fans to produce artwork using blood. One such example is actually by drummer Hellhammer himself, who wrote lyrics to Pagan Fears in his own blood as can be seen on the Instagram page for thetruemayhemcollection in a post from October 2019. Artist Maxime André Taccardi has also produced a painting of Dead using his own blood.

Murder of Euronymous, De Mysteriis Dom Sathanas and breakup (1991–1994)

Dead's suicide and Euronymous's actions following it affected Necrobutcher so much that he left Mayhem, thinning the band's ranks down to two. The group rehearsed for a short time thereafter with Occultus, joining the band with plans to begin recording vocal and bass tracks for Mayhem's debut album, De Mysteriis Dom Sathanas. However, this was short-lived; he left the band after receiving a death threat from Euronymous. In July 1993, Live in Leipzig was released as the band's tribute to Dead.

In late 1992, the recording of Mayhem's upcoming album resumed; thus Aarseth engaged three more session musicians: Burzum's Varg Vikernes (stage name "Count Grishnackh"), Thorns' Snorre W. Ruch ("Blackthorn"), who handled bass guitar and rhythm guitar respectively, and singer Attila Csihar, of Hungarian black metal band Tormentor. Due to complaints by his parents, Euronymous closed his scene focal point record shop Helvete, claiming as reasons adverse media and police attention. Much of the album was recorded during the first half of 1993 at the Grieg Hall in Bergen. To coincide with the release of the album, Euronymous and Vikernes had conspired to blow up Nidaros Cathedral, which appears on the album cover. Euronymous's murder in August 1993 put an end to this plan and delayed the album's release.

On 10 August 1993, Vikernes murdered Euronymous. On that night, Vikernes and Ruch travelled 518 km from Bergen to Euronymous' apartment in Oslo. Upon their arrival, a confrontation ensued, which ended when Vikernes fatally stabbed Euronymous. His body was found outside the apartment with twenty-three cut wounds — two to the head, five to the neck and sixteen to the back. Vikernes claims that Euronymous had plotted to torture him to death and videotape the event, using a meeting about an unsigned contract as a pretext. On the night of the murder, Vikernes claims he intended to hand Euronymous the signed contract and "tell him to fuck off", but that Euronymous attacked him first. Additionally, Vikernes also claimed that most of Euronymous' cut wounds were caused by broken glass he had fallen on during the struggle. Vikernes was arrested within days, and a few months later he was sentenced to 21 years in prison, the maximum sentence administered in Norway, for both the murder and church arsons; he was released from prison in 2009. Blackthorn, who waited for Vikernes downstairs and took no part in Aarseth's murder, was charged with complicity in murder and sentenced to serve 8 years in prison. With only Attila and Hellhammer remaining, Mayhem ceased to exist.

In a video interview with Consequence of Sound on 15 October 2019, Necrobutcher discussed his bitterness toward Euronymous after being replaced in the band with Varg Vikernes before the recording of De Mysteriis Dom Sathanas. Then he turned to the murder of Euronymous, offering an eye-opening revelation:

"OK, I can tell it right now, because I’ve been holding it in for many years, but actually I was on my way down to kill him myself. And when it happened, I saw the morning paper, thinking ‘Fuck, I gotta get home to my place and get out all the weapons and drugs and shit I had in my house, because they’re coming to my house because I’m probably going to be the No. 1 suspect for this.' But little did I know that the Norwegian police already knew that Count Grishnackh [Varg] was going down also to kill him. Because they bugged his phone, and he actually talked about this killing before he went to Bergen so the cops already knew that he was coming, so they probably were thinking to themselves, ‘We didn’t nail this guy for the church burnings, so let’s nail him for murder, and get rid of this fucking guy in Oslo the same time.’ So that's basically what happened."

In May 1994, De Mysteriis Dom Sathanas was released and dedicated to Euronymous. Its release had been delayed due to complaints filed by Euronymous' parents, who had objected to the presence of bass guitar parts played by Vikernes. According to Vikernes himself, Hellhammer assured Aarseth's parents that he would re-record the bass tracks himself; being unable to play bass guitar, Hellhammer left the bass tracks unchanged, and so the album features Vikernes as bassist.

Reunion with Maniac and Necrobutcher and introduction of Blasphemer (1995–2004)

In 1995, a bootleg live recording of a 1990 Mayhem concert was released, titled The Dawn of the Black Hearts. Despite being a bootleg, the album is sometimes listed as one of the band's main albums, mainly due to the notoriety regarding the cover art, which is one of the aforementioned photographs of Dead shortly after he died from suicide.

Around that time, Hellhammer, Maniac, and Necrobutcher had reformed the band with new guitarist Rune Eriksen ("Blasphemer") in place of Euronymous. Despite arousing some controversy and scepticism for reforming without founding member Euronymous, the group returned with the 1997 Wolf's Lair Abyss EP.

In this new phase, statements by Hellhammer (who spoke out against race mixing and foreigners in Norway) and the use of Nazi imagery such as swastika flags in the rehearsal room, the Totenkopf emblem and band merchandise featuring the symbol of the military branch of Nasjonal Samling led to controversy and accusations of neo-Nazism.

Additionally, Hellhammer stated that no member of the new line-up was a Satanist, and that the "Satanic stuff […] isn't what I feel Mayhem is about today. […] Mayhem's music is still dark, but I wouldn't say that it's Satanic."

The band's second full-length album, Grand Declaration of War, was released in 2000. Strongly influenced by progressive and avant-garde metal, the album was concept-based, dealing with themes of war and post-apocalyptic destruction. Maniac largely abandoned the traditional black metal rasp for dramatic spoken-word monologue, with most of the songs sequencing seamlessly into one another. Because of this conceptual straying, however, the album received harsh criticism.

Mayhem made headlines in 2003 when fan Per Kristian Hagen landed in the hospital with a fractured skull after being hit by a severed sheep's head that had been thrown into the audience from the stage. Assault charges were filed, but the band considered it to have been entirely accidental.

The band released Chimera in 2004, showing a return to their initial raw sound, but with higher production value and a progressive edge.

Later that year, Maniac left the band. According to Necrobutcher, this was due to his alcoholism induced by stage fright. Necrobutcher explained that because of this tendency, a violent encounter between the singer and Blasphemer led to the guitarist kicking Maniac down a flight of stairs, resulting in injury. Csihar was reinstated as his replacement.

Return of Csihar; Ordo Ad Chao (2004–2008)

The band's fourth full-length album, Ordo ad Chao (Latin for "Order to Chaos"), was released in April 2007. Ordo ad Chao contained a much rawer sound than the rest of the band's recent work; the drums were not equalized and the mix was notably bass-heavy against black metal convention. The album continued the band's experiments with unorthodox song structures, with "Illuminate Eliminate," at 9:40, the band's second longest track (behind Grand Declaration of War’s "Completion in Science of Agony (Part I)" at 9:44). The album received strong reviews and was the band's highest-charting album, peaking at No. 12 on the Norwegian charts. In early 2008 Ordo Ad Chao won a Spellemannprisen, an award from the largest and oldest of Norway's music awards shows, for Best Metal Album of 2007.

In April 2008, Blasphemer announced his plans to leave the band, expressing a lack of desire to continue despite satisfaction with their accomplishments. He played European festival dates over the following months, with his last performance in the group coming in August. He thereafter continued work with the Portuguese band Ava Inferi. This marked the departure of the musician credited with the bulk of the musical composition of the band's three most recent studio albums.

After Blasphemer's departure and Esoteric Warfare (2008–2015)
Statements of imminent touring plans were announced on the band's web page a few weeks after their final dates with Blasphemer. In October 2008, Krister Dreyer ("Morfeus") of Dimension F3H and Limbonic Art joined the group as touring guitarist for their upcoming South America Fucking Armageddon tour.

The band toured through late 2008 and 2009 with this lineup, prior to announcing Summer 2009 dates with Silmaeth, a French musician, as a second touring guitar. In November 2009, the band was arrested in Tilburg, Netherlands, after destroying a hotel room while on tour. Norwegian guitarist Teloch of Nidingr replaced Silmaeth, and British guitarist Charles Hedger (aka Ghul) of Imperial Vengeance replaced Morfeus, in 2011 and 2012.

In an interview in 2012, Necrobutcher revealed that Mayhem had begun work on their fifth studio album. As of November 2013, the new album was being mixed, with an early 2014 release date expected. Several months later, on 18 February 2014, it was announced that Mayhem would release a new album in May 2014, with a new song "Psywar" made available for streaming.

On 20 February 2014, the band's record label, Season of Mist, announced that the new album Esoteric Warfare would be released worldwide on 27 May 2014. This marked the first Mayhem studio effort since Blasphemer's departure and Teloch's permanent status in the band.

In January 2015, Mayhem, Watain, and Revenge played together as part of the "Black Metal Warfare" tour in the United States. Mayhem and Watain toured again in the United States in November 2015 with Rotting Christ as "Part II" of the previous tour.

Live album, Lords of Chaos film and Daemon (2016–2020)

A live recording of De Mysteriis Dom Sathanas (DMDS Alive) was released in 2016. The same year rapper Ghostemane released the song Euronymous, a reference to the band.

Later the same year, a film about the band Lords of Chaos (based on the book of the same name) premiered at the Sundance Film Festival, directed by Jonas Åkerlund, again propelling the group into the media spotlight. While the film received mixed reviews from both critics and fans, band members Necrobutcher and Csihar strongly objected to the movie, despite initially granting the rights to use the band's songs. In several interviews, the two argued that the film gave a one-sided perspective of the story, with particular complaints given to the failure to showcase the deteriorating relationship between Euronymous and Dead in the year before the latters suicide in April 1991. In 2018, the band released a remixed and remastered version of A Grand Declaration of War.
 
Mayhem's sixth studio album, Daemon, was released on 25 October 2019 through Century Media Records. Three singles: Worthless Abominations Destroyed, Of Worms and Ruins and Falsified and Hated were released ahead of the album. The album is characterised by a return to the more traditional style of black metal like in De Mysteriis and contains 10 new songs with a further two bonus tracks and several covers [including of Dead's old band Morbid] in the extended album. A music video for Falsified And Hated was released on 7 November and shows what appears to be a shaking tent ritual; it also shows a heart being cut open as part of this. Ziggy Jonas Rasmusson, a graffiti artist, was involved in the design.

In 2020, it was announced that drummer Tony Laureano would temporarily be filling-in for Hellhammer on the Decibel Magazine Tour due to Hellhammer suffering from a shoulder injury. The tour was, however, ultimately cancelled due to the COVID-19 pandemic.

Atavistic Black Disorder / Kommando (2021–present)

In 2021, Mayhem was inducted into the Rockheim Hall of Fame, after being nominated for the third time earlier the same year. As of 2021, they are the only black metal group to be inducted.

Mayhem announced a new EP Atavistic Black Disorder / Kommando that was released on 9 July 2021. The track listing consists of 3 outtakes from the Daemon sessions, two of which were used as bonus tracks on the deluxe edition of the album along with 4 cover songs from punk rock bands who the band cite as "laying the foundation of what was to come". The EP features guest appearances by former vocalists Messiah and Maniac on one cover track each. This marks Messiah and Maniac's first studio recordings with the band since 1987's Deathcrush and 2004's Chimera respectively. Necrobutcher stated the two former vocalists were brought in "because of their obvious connection with punk".

Mayhem announced a 2022 United States tour, The Sanguine Sodomy of North America, that began March 7 with a show in San Francisco, California and is projected to end on April 3 after a show in Joliet, Illinois. On 4 March, Watain announced that they would not be able to participate in the tour due to a United States embassy "decid[ing] to launch an additional, undisclosed 'administrative process' in relation to [their] visa applications".

Band members

Current members
 Necrobutcher – bass guitar (1984–1991, 1995–present)
 Hellhammer – drums, percussion (1987–1993, 1995–present)
 Attila Csihar – vocals (1992–1993, 2004–present)
 Teloch – guitar (2011–present)
 Ghul – guitar (2012–present)

Notable former members
 Euronymous – guitar (1984–1993) (died 1993)
 Manheim – drums, percussions (1984–1987)
 Maniac – vocals (1986–1988, 1995–2004)
 Dead – vocals (1988–1991) (died 1991)
 Count Grishnackh – bass guitar (1992–1993)
 Blackthorn – guitar (1992–1993)
 Blasphemer – guitar (1995–2008)

Discography

Studio albums
 De Mysteriis Dom Sathanas (1994)
 Grand Declaration of War (2000)
 Chimera (2004)
 Ordo ad Chao (2007)
 Esoteric Warfare (2014)
 Daemon (2019)

Videography
 Live in Ski (1986)
 Home-made rehearsal with Dead (1988)
 Live in Sarpsborg (1990)
 Live in Jessheim (1990)
 Live in Bischofswerda (1998)
 European Legions: Live in Marseille 2000 (2001)
 Mayhem – Cult of Aggression (Norwegian/Swedish documentary by Stefan Rydehed) (2002)
Live at Wacken (2004) 
 Appearance in Metal: A Headbanger's Journey (2005)
 Appearance in BBC One World episode Death Metal Murders (2005)
 Once Upon a Time in Norway – The History of Mayhem and the Rise of Norwegian Black Metal (2008)
 Pure Fucking Mayhem (English documentary by Stefan Rydehed) (2008)
 Until the Light Takes Us (American documentary by Aaron Aites/Audrey Ewell) (2008)
 De Mysteriis Dom Sathanas Alive (2016)

References

Bibliography

External links

 

 
Norwegian black metal musical groups
Musical groups established in 1984
1984 establishments in Norway
Musical groups disestablished in 1993
1993 disestablishments in Norway
Musical groups reestablished in 1994
Spellemannprisen winners
Musical quintets
Musical groups from Akershus
Articles which contain graphical timelines
Obscenity controversies in music
Season of Mist artists
Scandals in Norway
Controversies in Norway